The 1992 St. George earthquake was a  earthquake that occurred on September 2, 1992 at approximately 4:26 AM MDT along the Washington Fault zone near the larger Hurricane Fault about  southeast of St. George in Utah, United States. No people were killed by the quake.

Earthquake

Magnitude
Reports on the magnitude of the earthquake vary.

Destruction
Most of the force of the earthquake was directed away from the city of St. George toward Hurricane and Springdale. In the Balanced Rock Hills area of Springdale, a landslide covered part of Utah State Route 9, taking several hours to complete movement.

See also
List of earthquakes in 1992
List of earthquakes in the United States
List of earthquakes in Utah
List of earthquakes in Nevada

References

St. George
St. George
St. George
St. George
St. George, Utah